Robert Everard Woodson (28 April 1904 – 6 November 1963) was an American botanist. He received a 
degree in biology in 1929 at Washington University in St. Louis, Missouri.

He gave classes in botany at Washington University, and from 1945 to 1963 he was a regular professor. He was also curator of the Missouri Botanical Garden.

Notes

References

1904 births
1963 deaths
Missouri Botanical Garden people
Washington University in St. Louis alumni
Washington University in St. Louis faculty
Scientists from St. Louis
20th-century American botanists